Andrew Stevovich (born 1948) is an American painter. He is best known for oil paintings and pastels that combine abstract formalities with a figurative narrative. He has also produced lithographs, etchings, and wood-block prints.

Biography

Stevovich was born in Austria in 1948, coming to the United States with his family in 1950. He grew up in Washington, D.C. and graduated from the Rhode Island School of Design in 1970. He earned his Masters in Fine Arts from the Massachusetts College of Art and Design. His first solo exhibition took place in 1971 at the Alpha Gallery in Boston, Massachusetts. Since 1981, he has been represented by Warren Adelson in New York City, first at the Coe Kerr Gallery and after 1991 at the Adelson Galleries.

A retrospective exhibition took place at the Danforth Museum in Framingham, Massachusetts, in 1999. In 2008–2009, another retrospective, The Truth About Lola, curated by Bartholomew Bland, took place at the Hudson River Museum in Yonkers, New York, and traveled to the Boca Raton Museum of Art, Florida.

Stevovich's work is in numerous public collections, including the Boston Museum of Fine Arts, the Danforth Museum, the DeCordova Museum, the New Britain Museum of American Art, and the Portland Museum of Art in Maine.

Major influences on the development of his work include Giotto, Duccio, Sassetta, Fra Angelico and other early Italian artists, as well as Paul Gauguin and German Expressionists such as Erich Heckel.

His work has been described by John Sacret Young as a "successful fusion of the classicism of the Flemish and Italian Renaissance painters to his contemporary subject matter." The art critic, Carol Diehl wrote: Obsessed with paring down compositions to their essential elements, Stevovich has a passion for simplicity. At the same time, he's also fascinated by complexity—pattern and repetition—which, by its nature, requires a plethora of shapes or images. His work, therefore, is all about the marriage of these opposites.

Stevovich lives and works in Massachusetts.

Beasts and Citizens
In 2000, Stevovich created a series of eight etchings for Beasts and Citizens, a limited edition book of forty fables by Jean de La Fontaine, translated from the French by Craig Hill. One hundred and thirty-five copies were printed and bound with the etchings. The images were loosely based on the fables Discord, The Lion's Share, The Fox and the Grapes, The Mountain That Labored, The Swallow and the Nightingale, Doctors, The Two Bulls and the Frog, and The Cat Who Became a Woman.

Selected solo exhibitions
Greenville County Museum of Art: Greenville, South Carolina 2020
Adelson Galleries: New York, New York 1992, 1995, 1999, 2001, 2004, 2007, 2010, 2015
Adelson Galleries Boston: Boston, Massachusetts 2012, 2015, 2018
Alpha Gallery: Boston, Massachusetts 1971, 1973, 1976, 1978
Boca Raton Museum of Art: Boca Raton, Florida 2009
Coe Kerr Gallery: New York, New York 1983, 1985, 1987, 1990
Danforth Museum of Art: Framingham, Massachusetts 1999, 2007
Hudson River Museum: Yonkers, New York 2008 – 2009
Little Center Gallery: Clark University, Worcester, Massachusetts 1980
Mitsukoshi Gallery: Ebisu, Tokyo, Japan 1996
New Britain Museum of American Art: New Britain, Connecticut 1975
Pisa Galleries: Tokyo, Japan 1992
Tatistcheff-Rogers Gallery: Santa Monica, California 1989, 1993
Terrence Rogers Fine Art: Santa Monica, California 2000
Virginia Lynch Gallery: Tiverton, Rhode Island 1992, 2002

Publications

Books about Andrew Stevovich

Selected reviews and texts
 Bergeron, Chris (October 25, 2007). "Uncomfortably Numb" MetroWest Daily News (Massachusetts). Retrieved 15 December 2013.
 Cohen, Ronny (April 1990). "Andrew Stevovich". Artforum (New York).
 Gardner, James (October 18, 2007). "The Dispassionate Perfectionist". New York Sun. Retrieved 15 December 2013.
 Garnett, Adrienne (Winter 2008–2009). "Outside, Inside, Future, Then, and Now". Art of the Times (Florida).
 Genocchio, Benjamin (December 19, 2008). "From an Observer Who Misses Little, Lavish Details". The New York Times. Retrieved 15 December 2013.
Kologe, Brian R. (May 1980). "Andrew V. Stevovich". Art New England, vol.1, no. 6.
 Nigrosh, Leon (September 10–16, 1999). "The Abstract, Alternate World of Andrew Stevovich"  Worcester Phoenix (Massachusetts). Retrieved 15 December 2013.
 Stapen, Nancy (February 1982). "Andrew Stevovich". Art New England, vol.3, no. 3.
 Taylor, Robert (January 10, 1982). "Stevovich Conveys Today's Edginess and Ambiguity".  The Boston Globe.
 Temin, Christine (October 6, 1999). "Incredible Lightness of Stevovich". The Boston Globe.

References

External links 

  Stevovich website Images of paintings, articles and reviews, and exhibition history. Retrieved 15 December 2013.
 Description of "Essential Elements" at Hard Press Editions. Retrieved 15 December 2013.
  Adelson Galleries New York website. Retrieved 15 December 2013.
  Adelson Galleries Boston website. Retrieved 15 December 2013.

1948 births
Living people
American contemporary painters
20th-century American painters
American male painters
21st-century American painters
21st-century American male artists
Artists from Massachusetts
Rhode Island School of Design alumni
Massachusetts College of Art and Design alumni
Austrian emigrants to the United States
20th-century American male artists